The Sweet Escape Tour was the second concert tour by American recording artist Gwen Stefani. The tour began in April 2007 in support of her second solo album The Sweet Escape (2006). Performing for nearly a hundred concerts, the tour traveled to the Americas, Australia, Asia and Europe.

The shows in North America ranked 23rd on Billboard "Top 25 Tours". The 55 reported shows grossed $30.6 million with 648,529 tickets sold.

Background

The tour was Stefani's follow up to her previous 2005 tour. It went worldwide as compared to her previous tour which was constricted only to North America and had more than double the number of shows. It was Stefani's last solo effort as she rejoined her band No Doubt after the tour ended. The main feature were usage of various props such as a prison for Stefani's opening act, a six-piece band and a large multimedia screen in the backdrop showing videos and animations.

On her June 22 and June 23 concerts in Irvine, California, Stefani was joined onstage by her No Doubt bandmates. They performed: "Just a Girl", "Spiderwebs", "Sunday Morning", "Hella Good" and their cover of Talk Talk's "It's My Life".

In response to the 2007 California wildfires, Stefani donated $166,000 from her October 30 concert in San Diego to "The San Diego Foundation" fire relief fund. 

The tour had its own set of controversies. A group known as "The National Union of Malaysian Muslim Students" wanted to ban Stefani's concert that was slated to take place on August 21 at Putra Indoor Stadium. The union's vice president, Abdul Muntaqim said, "Her performance and her attire are not suitable for our culture. It promotes a certain degree of obscenity and will encourage youth to emulate the western lifestyle. The concert should be stopped." The organizer of the vent, Maxis Communications later responded, "Stefani has confirmed that her concert will not feature any revealing costumes. She will abide by the Malaysian authorities' guidelines to ensure that her show will not be offensive to local sensitivities." 

In April, Akon drew criticism for having on-stage dirty dancing with a fifteen-year-old preacher's daughter, at a club in Trinidad and Tobago, as part of a fake contest. As a result, the tour's sponsor Verizon Wireless decided not to sponsor the tour.

Critical reception 
The Sweet Escape tour was generally well-received by critics. Ricardo Baca (The Denver Post) stated the concert in Denver showed Stefani had the tact to become a solo pop star. He continues, "Wednesday's show was proof of Stefani the rock star. While she's still better suited for the sneering pop-ska of her band No Doubt, she does all right with the glittery, hip-hop-fueled Top 40-loving music on which she has built her solo career." For the concert in Mansfield, Joan Anderman of The Boston Globe stated, "Ironically, for a performer so enamored of artifice, Stefani perpetually comes off as one of the more genuine chart-toppers. Her voice was built for amped-up cheers like "Hollaback Girl," not slow jams like "Luxurious," but her bad notes were hers, part of a real personality rather than a standard-issue pop star." 

Ross Raihala (St. Paul Pioneer Press) described her performance in Saint Paul as a "high spirited, energetic sugar rush". He goes on to say, "Yet it was the fresh stuff that made the night work. The high-tech stage and carefully choreographed dance numbers rarely felt canned, and just when they started to get overwhelming, Stefani sprinted to the back of the auditorium and up into the seats to perform a stripped-down 'Cool' [,] surrounded by awestruck fans." Chris Macias of The Sacramento Bee stated her show in Wheatland had a natural sweetness. He says, "Stefani certainly doesn't skimp on her shows. It's part pep rally (the "b-a-n-a-n-a-s" chant in 'Hollaback Girl'), part Broadway musical (the bit from 'The Sound of Music' in 'Wind it Up' that turns Stefani into a yodel-back girl), plus a whole lot of breakdancing from Stefani's sidekicks. [...] With a five-piece band perched high on a riser, and a giant 'G' that descended occasionally from the top of the stage, this concert had plenty of eye and ear candy." 

At the Shoreline Amphitheatre, Neva Chonin (San Francisco Chronicle) affirmed the show was stiff and robotic. She says, "Stefani gave back to them with a show in which every line, every move and every gesture was carbon-copied from every other show on the tour, excepting the usual local shout-outs. This doesn't mean she's not sincere when she rhapsodizes over the charms of the Bay Area, or gushes about how amazed she is to be a star and how grateful she is to her fans for helping her become one. It simply means she's gone so far into the star-making machinery she's forgotten how to convey that sincerity in anything besides packaged sound bites."

Derek Paiva of The Honolulu Advertiser described Stefani's show in Honolulu as "infectiously energetic". He states, "In times like these, Stefani showed the fun, endearing and still very grateful side of her that all the costume changes, unnecessary stage production, slickly dumb songs and accompanying bling can't bury. Until she returns to Hawai'i with No Doubt — writer crosses his fingers here — this would have to do."

For the concert in San Diego, T. Michael Crowell (San Diego Union-Tribune) said "Stefani is not the best singer in the biz. Her vocal range is narrow, and her pitch is not always dead-on. But that misses the point of her performance. Her art is the imagery she brings to the stage, the Stefani style, her personal fashion statement, her brand. [...] Not bad for the skater-girl next door, now all grown-up and ready for a little fun."

Opening acts
Akon (North America, select dates)
Lady Sovereign (North America, select dates)
Gym Class Heroes (Australasia)
CSS (Europe)
Brick & Lace (Camden)
Plastilina Mosh (Monterrey)
Maria José (Mexico City)
The Hall Effect (Bogotá)
Hoku (Honolulu)
Sean Kingston (Las Vegas, Tucson, San Diego, Stockton, Oakland, Santa Barbara)

Setlist
The following setlist was obtained from the April 28, 2007 concert, at the Cricket Wireless Pavilion in Phoenix, Arizona. It does not represent all concerts for the duration of the tour. 
"The Sweet Escape" (performed with Akon)
"Rich Girl" (contains elements of the "James Bond Theme")
"Yummy"
"4 in the Morning"
"Luxurious"
"Early Winter"
"Wind It Up"
"Fluorescent"
"Danger Zone"
"Hollaback Girl"
"Now That You Got It"
"Don't Get It Twisted" / "Breakin' Up
"Cool"
"Wonderful Life"
"Orange County Girl"
Encore
"The Real Thing"
"U Started It"
"What You Waiting For?"

Tour dates

Music festivals and other miscellaneous performances
This concerts was a part of the Summer Sonic Festival
This concert was a part of the Homecoming Concert

Cancellations and rescheduled shows

Box office score data

External links

The official Tour book by Hewlett-Packard

References

Gwen Stefani concert tours
2007 concert tours